Opinion Stage is an online interactive content creation service (focused on polling, voting, and quizzes) integrating social networks and online advertising.

Overview

The tool permits the creation of polls and quizzes featuring text, images, and video, and is offered as a self service.

The Opinion Stage widget optionally makes use of social polling and voting (people use their social network identities to vote), intended to promote social sharing, drive social traffic to the site, improve voting authenticity, and facilitate demographic filtering.

The polls created with Opinion Stage can be shared on online social network and embedded on most types of websites. The widget software uses responsive design techniques to support various platforms and screen sizes. Opinion Stage works also as a standalone platform, the users having personalized home pages with the polls they are interested in.

The company has a dual business model, utilizing a freemium model on the one hand – offering basic functionality for free and paid plans for professional use – and on the other hand working with larger publishers on a basis of revenue sharing from advertising.

History

Founders Assaf Parag and Gil Yoffe created the company in September 2011 and launched the Opinion Stage debating website at the end of that year. Parag mentioned in an interview that the idea was inspired by the protest movements seen around the world that year: "Last summer (2011) there were all these big demonstrations all over the world. All these people would participate and go back home and express their opinions on social networks but in a very unstructured way. So you don’t know who supports what and why. This is how we came to Opinion Stage. We wanted to structure all these opinions that are out there". In early 2013, the company shifted its focus to online polling solutions, and in late 2015 expanded its scope to include more forms of interactive content, such as trivia quizzes.

References

External links
 

Polling companies
Web applications
Meta Platforms applications